USS Seminole may refer to the following ships of the United States Navy:

 , launched in 1859, commissioned in 1860 and decommissioned in 1865.
 , a tug, built in 1879, purchased as Kate Jones in 1898 and commissioned the same year. She was decommissioned in 1898, and transferred to the War Department in 1900.
 , commissioned in 1940 and sunk by enemy action in October 1942.
 , commissioned in 1945 and decommissioned in 1970.

United States Navy ship names